George Spencer Watson R.O.I., R.P., A.R.A., R.A. (8 March 1869, in London – 11 April 1934, in London) was an English portrait artist of the late romantic school who sometimes worked in the style of the Italian Renaissance.

Career
He studied at the Royal Academy Schools from 1889, and exhibited at the Royal Academy from 1891. He won Royal Academy Schools Silver Medals in 1889 and 1891, and the Landseer Scholarship in 1892. He was elected to the Royal Institute of Oil Painters (ROI) in 1900, Royal Society of Portrait Painters (RP) in 1904, Associate of the Royal Academy in 1923, and a Member of the Royal Academy (RA) in 1932. His work was also part of the painting event in the art competition at the 1928 Summer Olympics.

Personal life
In 1909 he married Hilda Mary Gardiner, a dancer and mime artist, and follower of the actor Edward Gordon Craig. They had a daughter, Mary Spencer Watson (1913–2006), who became a sculptor. In the year of 1923 he bought Dunshay Manor in the hills of the Isle of Purbeck, after already having spent holidays in nearby Swanage.

He died in London at age 65 and a memorial exhibition was held at the Fine Art Society in the same year. There is a memorial to him in the north vestibule of St James's Church, Piccadilly.

Works
Some of his works are held at Tate Britain, the Harris Art Gallery, Preston and collections in Bournemouth, Liverpool, Plymouth and the National Gallery of Canada. 
Born in London, Watson studied at the Royal Academy from 1889; he exhibited there from 1891 and also at the Paris salon. Retrospective exhibitions were held at the Galerie Heinemann, Munich in 1912, and at the Fine Art Society in 1914. 
His work A Lady in Black (1922) is owned by the Tate Collection.

 Cynthia - circa 1932 
 A Cottage Garden - 1928 (view of Dunshay)
 The Adoration - 19??
 The Creation -1921 -Wolverhampton Art Gallery, West Midlands, UK
 The Birth of Venus - 1933 - Russell-Cotes Art Gallery and Museum, Bournemouth, UK
 Peter and the bear -1915
 Portrait of Monica Boyd - 1909
 Portrait of Esther Harris - 1904
 Portrait of James Harris (accountant) and his dog
 Dorothy Mulloch 1919
 The Fountain - 1900
 Sir Francis Eden Lacey, as Secretary of the MCC, 1928.
 Girl in a Feathered Hat 
 Marishka - nude
 The Three Wise Kings - held by Rochdale Art Gallery, Lancashire, UK
 Nude 1927 -  Harris Museum and Art Gallery, Preston, Lancashire, UK, purchase for £300 by Preston Town Council 1927
 Mary, 1932 Oil on canvas, of his daughter [Mary Spencer Watson] held by the Royal Academy
 My lady of the rose 
 Miss Beaton, 1934, 'Baba' Beaton, (Mrs. Alec Hambro)
 George Elkington Past Master Quatuor Coronati Lodge (2076)
 Sir Montague Sharpe - Middlesex Guildhall Collection
 Four Loves I found, a Woman, a Child, a Horse and a Hound - 1922
 A picnic at Portofino, 1911 
 The Saddler's Daughter (Mary Spencer Watson)
 The orange dress, 1926

Gallery

See also
 Royal Academy

References

External links

 

1869 births
1934 deaths
19th-century English painters
English male painters
20th-century English painters
Royal Academicians
Olympic competitors in art competitions
20th-century English male artists
19th-century English male artists